Buffalo Creek is a stream in the U.S. state of South Dakota.

Brushy Creek was named on account of buffalo bones along its course.

See also
List of rivers of South Dakota

References

Rivers of Lake County, South Dakota
Rivers of Minnehaha County, South Dakota
Rivers of South Dakota